Tuktoyaktuk , or Tuktuyaaqtuuq  (Inuvialuktun: it looks like a caribou), is an Inuvialuit hamlet located in the Inuvik Region of the Northwest Territories, Canada, at the northern terminus of the Inuvik–Tuktoyaktuk Highway. One of six Inuvialuit communities in the Inuvialuit Settlement Region, it is commonly referred to by its first syllable, Tuk . It lies north of the Arctic Circle on the shores of the Arctic Ocean, and is the only place on the Arctic Ocean connected to the rest of Canada by road. Known as Port Brabant after British colonization, in 1950 it became the first Indigenous settlement in Canada to reclaim its traditional name.

History 

Tuktoyaktuk is the anglicized form of the native Inuvialuit place-name, meaning "resembling a caribou". According to legend, a woman looked on as some caribou, common at the site, waded into the water and turned into stone, or became petrified. Today, reefs resembling these petrified caribou are said to be visible at low tide along the shore of the town.

No formal archaeological sites exist today, but the settlement has been used by the native Inuvialuit for centuries as a place to harvest caribou and beluga whales. In addition, Tuktoyaktuk's natural harbour was historically used as a means to transport supplies to other Inuvialuit settlements.

Between 1890 and 1910, a sizeable number of Tuktoyaktuk's native families were wiped out in flu epidemics brought in by American whalers. In subsequent years, the Dene people, as well as residents of Herschel Island, settled here. By 1937, the Hudson's Bay Company had established a trading post. On 9 September 1944, a serious fall windstorm blew through the community and severely damaged several buildings and schooners docked at the harbour, also killing 11 people en route back from a reindeer station on the Anderson River on the schooner Cally.

Radar domes were installed beginning in the 1950s as part of the Distant Early Warning Line, to monitor air traffic and detect possible Soviet intrusions during the Cold War. The settlement's location (and harbour) made Tuk important in resupplying the civilian contractors and Air Force personnel along the DEW Line. In 1947, Tuktoyaktuk became the site of one of the first government day schools, designed to forcibly assimilate Inuit youth into 'mainstream' Canadian culture.

The community of Tuktoyaktuk eventually became a base for the oil and natural gas exploration of the Beaufort Sea. Large industrial buildings remain from the busy period following the Organization of Arab Petroleum Exporting Countries 1973 oil embargo and 1979 summertime fuel shortage. This brought many more outsiders into the region.

In late 2010, the Canadian Environmental Assessment Agency announced that an environmental study would be undertaken on a proposed all-weather road between Inuvik and Tuktoyaktuk. Work on the Inuvik–Tuktoyaktuk Highway officially started on 8 January 2014, and the highway was officially opened on 15 November 2017.

Geography 
Tuktoyaktuk is set on Kugmallit Bay, near the Mackenzie River Delta, and is located on the Arctic tree line.

Tuktoyaktuk is the gateway for exploring Pingo National Landmark, an area protecting eight nearby pingos in a region which contains approximately 1,350 of these Arctic ice-dome hills.

Employment
Many locals still hunt, fish, and trap. Locals rely on caribou in the autumn, ducks and geese in both spring and autumn, and fishing year-round. Other activities include collecting driftwood, berrypicking, and reindeer herding. Most productivity today comes from tourism and transportation. Marine Transportation Services (MTS) is a major employer in this region. In addition, the oil and gas industry continues to employ explorers and other workers.

Demographics

The average annual personal income in 2015 was $21,984 Canadian and the average family income was $55,424. Local languages are Inuinnaqtun (Inuvialuktun) and English with a few North Slavey and Tłı̨chǫ (Dogrib) speakers. Tuktoyaktuk is predominately Indigenous (90.8%) with Inuit (Inuvialuit) making up 88.0%, 9.2% non-Aboriginal, 1.7% First Nations and 1.1% giving multiple Indigenous backgrounds.

Climate
Tuktoyaktuk displays a subarctic climate (Dfc), bordering on a tundra climate (ET), as the July mean temperature is barely above . Since the Arctic Ocean freezes over for much of the year, the maritime influence is minimized, resulting in cold winters and a strong seasonal lag in spring. This results in colder Aprils than Octobers and much colder Mays than Septembers. March is also colder than December, and is the only month yet to not record a temperature above freezing at any point. Due to the dominance of cold air, Tuktoyaktuk has a lower precipitation rate than many desert climates. In spite of this, the cold temperatures mean it receives more than a metre of snow a year on average. Owing to the thousands of kilometers of land to the south of Tuktoyaktuk, southerly winds can sometimes push warmer air into the region. Rex blocks can cause an exceptionally strong ridge of high pressure to form at higher latitudes, allowing heat to build consistently. As a result, temperatures well above average can occur in summer in spite of the cold surrounding waters. During a bout of exceptionally hot Arctic weather, Tuktoyaktuk was among the numerous northern communities that recorded a new high temperature, reaching a high of 29.9°C (85.8°F) on July 4th, 2022. Tuktoyaktuk's climate stands in stark contrast to those of Northern Norway at similar latitudes, but is in many ways less extreme in comparison with Eastern Canada at lower latitudes, where summers are cooler, moderated by the cool waters of the Hudson Bay.

Transportation

Tuktoyaktuk/James Gruben Airport links Tuktoyaktuk to Inuvik. This 30-minute flight costs a few hundred dollars per passenger. Formerly in winter time, the Tuktoyaktuk Winter Road provided road access to Inuvik. The $300-million Inuvik–Tuktoyaktuk Highway opened in November 2017, which provides all-season access to Inuvik, which connects to the rest of the highway networks in Canada.

In popular culture
In the third episode of Jesse James Is a Dead Man, originally aired on 14 June 2009 on Spike TV, Jesse James rides his motorcycle from Inuvik to Tuktoyaktuk to drop off medical supplies.
Tuktoyaktuk is mentioned often as familiar territory to Benton Fraser in the TV show Due South. At one point, Ray Vecchio, Fraser's partner, confuses the name of this real town with a fictitious town he calls "Runamokluk".
Tuktoyaktuk is referenced numerous times in the Stompin' Tom Connors song "Mukluk Shoe".
The song "Canadian Girls" by Dean Brody briefly mentions Tuktoyaktuk.
Tuktoyaktuk is the subject of the song "Time Before Bones", Dana Sipos's winning song from CBC Radio 2's 2009 Great Canadian Song Quest competition.
On 3 September 1995, the Molson Brewing Company arranged for several popular rock bands to give a concert in Tuktoyaktuk as a publicity stunt promoting their new ice-brewed beer. During the months leading up to concert, radio stations across North America ran contests in which they gave away free tickets. Dubbed The Molson Ice Polar Beach Party, it featured Hole, Metallica, Moist, Cake and Veruca Salt. Canadian filmmaker Albert Nerenberg made a documentary about this concert, Invasion of the Beer People.
Tuktoyaktuk is featured in the Discovery Channel TV show Ice Road Truckers.

See also 
 List of municipalities in the Northwest Territories
 Territorial claims in the Arctic

References

External links

Official site

Communities in the Inuvik Region
Hamlets in the Northwest Territories
Inuit in the Northwest Territories
Inuvialuit communities
Populated places in Arctic Canada